The Vieilles Charrues Festival (literally: Old Ploughs Festival) is held every year in mid-July in the city of Carhaix, located in western Brittany, France.

This festival is the largest music festival in France, attracting more than 200,000 festival-goers every year (270,000 in 2011, 280,000 in 2017). This festival was created in 1992 in Landeleau, a small village in central Finistère. At that time, less than 500 revellers attended and the festival was more like a private party. The following year, the festival welcomed more than 2000 and that was the beginning of its success story. In 1995, due to lack of space on the original site, the festival moved to Carhaix city center and in 1998, for the same reason, the festival chose a site on the outskirts of Carhaix. In October 2016 the festival organizes an exceptional concert at Central Park in New York City in tribute to the many Bretons who were immigrants to the city in the nineteenth century.

Each year, more than 5,500 volunteers enable the festival to be a success, with their actions in the numerous bars, restaurants, and other stands of the festival. The festival thanks them by giving money to local associations. The organizers also helped to finance Hall Glenmor, a concert hall, and to renovate the Château de Kerampuil, a castle located near the site of the festival.

Lineups

2023 
 Thursday, July 13: Robbie Williams
 Friday, July 14: Blur, Aya Nakamura, Gazo, Jeanne Added, Shaka Ponk, Agar Agar, 
 Saturday, July 15: Rosalía, Lomepal

2020 
It was announced on 13 April 2020 that the 2020 edition would be cancelled due to the COVID-19 pandemic, even if Emmanuel Macron, the President of France, announced on 13 April that only festivals before mid-July had to be cancelled.

2019

2018 
 Thursday, July 19: Depeche Mode, Soulwax, Marquis de Sade, Olli and the Bollywood Orchestra
 Friday, July 20 : Kygo, IAM, Liam Gallagher, Jain, Mogwai, Cœur de pirate, Portugal. The Man, Rilès, Hungry 5 feat. Worakls, N'To & Joachim Pastor, Lomepal, Therapie Taxi, Throes + The Shine, Kokoko!, Lysistrata, Altın Gün, Delgrès, La Tène, Revolutionary Birds
 Saturday, July 21 : Gorillaz, Massive Attack, MØ, Damso, Ofenbach, Rone, Les Négresses Vertes, Yuksek, Charlotte Cardin, Young Fathers, Lee Fields & The Expressions, Rebeka Warrior, Saro, Artus, 'Ndiaz, Maria Simoglou
 Sunday, July 22 : Robert Plant & the Sensational Space Shifters, Fatboy Slim, Orelsan, Bigflo & Oli, Roméo Elvis, Véronique Sanson, Lorenzo, Oscar and the Wolf, Angèle, Eddy de Pretto, The Blaze, The Limiñanas, Inüit, Ÿuma, Ifriqiyya Électrique, Rizan Said Dour/Le Pottier Quartet

2017 
 Thursday, July 13: AllttA (20syl & Mr. J. Medeiros),  Manu Chao La Ventura, Justice, Deluxe, Feder, Rocky
 Friday, July 14: Die Antwoord, Phoenix, Dropkick Murphys, Faada Freddy, Renaud, Kungs, MHD, Sônge, The Celtic Social Club
 Saturday, July 15: Arcade Fire, Jean-Michel Jarre, Kery James, Møme, Colorado, Clément Bazin
 Sunday, July 16: Macklemore & Ryan Lewis, DJ Snake, Matmatah, Radio Elvis, Killason, Octave Noire, Acid Arab

2016 
In New York City (Central Park)
 Saturday, October 1 : Matthieu Chedid (‑M-), The Avener, The Celtic Social Club (members of Red Cardell, The Silencers and others), Krismenn & Alem, Alan Corbel

In Carhaix
 Thursday, July 14 : Les Insus (ex-Téléphone) / The Kills / Étienne de Crécy / Guizmo / Mickey 3D / Louis-Jean Cormier / Jeanne Added / Last Train / Mansfield Tya 
 Friday, July 15 : Pharrell Williams / Disclosure / Pixies / Michel Polnareff / Parov Stelar / Lou Doillon / Tindersticks / FIDLAR / Socalled  / Dominic Sonic / Ropoporose
 Saturday, July 16 : The Libertines / Louise Attaque / Alain Souchon and Laurent Voulzy / Suede / Ibrahim Maalouf / The Avener / Ibeyi / Hyphen Hyphen / Calypso Rose  
 Sunday, July 17 : Lana Del Rey / Major Lazer / Nekfeu / Louane / Jake Bugg / Editors / Lilly Wood and the Prick / Odesza / Denez Prigent / Jain / Sofiane Saïdi

2015 
 Thursday, July 16 : Muse / Brodinski / Anna Calvi / Soprano
 Friday, July 17 : The Chemical Brothers / Christine & The Queens / Tom Jones / Archive / The Do / Caravan Palace / Boris Brejcha / Ez3kiel
 Saturday, July 18 : The Prodigy / Tony Allen Review feat Damon Albarn / Calogero / George Ezra / Caribbean Dandee / The Strypes / The Shoes / SBTRKT
 Sunday, July 19 : Lionel Richie / David Guetta / Joan Baez / London Grammar / Flume / Dominique A / Brigitte / The Drums / La Fine Équipe / Puts Marie

2014 
 Thursday, July 17 : The Black Keys / Fauve / Skip the Use / Indochine / Vanessa Paradis / Christine And The Queens / Bakermat /  Francois & The Atlas Mountains 
 Friday, July 18 : Stromae / Franz Ferdinand / Elton John / The Celtic Social Club / Miossec / Gesaffelstein / Tinariwen / The Same Old Band
 Saturday, July 19 : Arctic Monkeys / Breton / Shaka Ponk / Détroit / Julien Doré / Diplo / The Red Goes Black / Falabella
 Sunday, July 20 : Thirty Seconds To Mars / Miles Kane / Girls In Hawaii / Lily Allen / Yodelice / Etienne Daho / Ky-Mani Marley / Totorro

2013 
 Thursday, July 18 : Rammstein, The Hives, Raphaël, Vitalic
 Friday, July 19 : Patrick Bruel, Two Door Cinema Club, -M- , Lilly Wood and the Prick, Keny Arkana, Naive New Beaters, Paul Kalkbrenner, Rokia Traoré, Suuns, BRNS, Half Moon Run, Juveniles, Lescop, Rangleklods, Youn Sun Nah, Jacky Molard Acoustique Quartet, Elektrik Gem, Serendou
 Saturday, July 20 : Neil Young, Asaf Avidan, Benjamin Biolay, Oxmo Puccino, Féfé, The Roots, Gentleman, Hanni El Khatib, Willy Belle, Rone, Jonathan Wilson, Superpoze, Yan Wagner, Cashmere Cat, Interzone Extended, Startijenn & El Taqa, Cansione / Grenanico, Fest-noz
 Sunday, July 21 : Phoenix, Carlos Santana, Marc Lavoine, Lou Doillon, The Vaccines, Alt-J (∆), Charles Bradley, Mermonte, Busy P / Ed Banger Megamix, Mesparrow, La Femme, Marie-Pierre Arthur, Skip&Die, La Gale, Barzaz, La Mal Coiffée, Turbo Sans Visa, Jack Danielle's String Band28,29.

2012 
Thursday : Portishead, LMFAO, Zebda, Rover, Keziah Jones, Django Django, Don Rimini, Stuck in the Sound, Beat Assaillant, Breakbot, La Rumeur, Baadman, Im Takt
Friday: The Cure, Martin Solveig, Thomas Dutronc, Metronomy, Brigitte, Hollie Cook, Bloc Party, M83, Youssoupha, Other Lives, Baxter Dury, Triggerfinger, El Hijo de la Cumbia, Danyèl Waro, Soïg Sibéril, Rich Aucoin, Sin Antesia, Colin
Saturday: Sting, Justice, Hubert-Félix Thiéfaine, Irma, Selah Sue, C2C, Busy P(cancelled and replaced by DVNO), The Rapture, Rodrigo y Gabriela & C.U.B.A., Kiril Djaikowski (+ guests), Sallie Ford & The Sound Outside, Kanka, Balthazar, Christine, Badume's Band, Selamnesh Zemene, Blue & Black Zebra, Bobby & Sue, le dernier championnat de Air Biniou, fest-noz (with Yann-Fañch Kemener/Menneteau, Vincendeau/Felder, Boulanger/Simon, Termajik)
Sunday: Bob Dylan, Gossip, Cœur de Pirate (cancelled), Chinese Man, Garbage, Orelsan, 1995, L'Ensemble Matheus, Kasabian, Amadou & Mariam, Santigold, Jesus Christ Fashion Barbe, Avishaï Cohen, Dope D.O.D., Zara Moussa, Random Recipe, Ar Rannou, Burek, Taol Lans

2011 

Thursday, July 14 : Scorpions, Snoop Dogg, Ar Re Yaouank, Kaiser Chiefs, Mondkopf, Yelle, Orchestre national de Barbès, Pulp, Olivia Ruiz, Jean-Louis Aubert, Adam Kesher, The Hyènes, Shaka Ponk, Julien Tiné, Le Grand Orchestre Armorigène, Stand High Patrol, Titi Robin Trio, Tremplin Taol Lans, La Canaille.
Friday, July 15 : Eddy Mitchell, David Guetta, M.I.A., The BellRays, Jack Johnson, Soprano, Foals, Cold War Kids, The Inspector Cluzo, Stromae, The Octopus, Systema Solar, Barrington Levy, DJ Elwood, Who knew, Lo Cor De La Plana, Siam, Sylvain Giro, Electric Bazar, Savaty.
Saturday, July 16 : Cypress Hill, Supertramp, Angus & Julia Stone, The Bloody Beetroots, Yannick Noah, Two Door Cinema Club, AaRON, Zebra & Le Bagad Carhaix, The Shoes, Tiga, Gildas Kitsune, Nasser, Crystal Fighters, Family of the Year, Misteur Valaire, Ibrahim Maalouf, Olli & Mood, Championnat du Monde d'Air Biniou, Kreiz Breizh Akademy 3, Savaty Orchestra, Fest Noz.
Sunday, July 17 : Lou Reed, The Chemical Brothers, Pierre Perret, PJ Harvey, Asaf Avidan & The Mojos, House of Pain, Ben L'Oncle Soul, Boogers, Congotronics vs Rockers, Goran Bregović, Gaetano Fabri, Nadara, Balkan Beat Box, DJ Tagada, Vojasa, Sondorgo feat Naat Veliov, Ladylike Lily, Marchand vs Burger, Leif Vollebekk, Duoud, Savaty Orchestra, Krismenn.

2010 
July 15–18 

Thursday, July 15 : Muse, Jacques Dutronc, Mr Oizo, Revolver, The Raveonettes.
Friday, July 16 : Mika,  Supreme NTM, Diam's, Vitalic, Sophie Hunger, Airbourne, The Black Box Revelation, Wovenhand, I Arkle, Baroness, Tagada Jones, The Incredible Punish Yourself Picture Show, Lyse, DJ Kemicalkem, Noïd
Saturday, July 17 : Indochine, Phoenix, Boys Noize, Gojira, Féfé, Gaëtan Roussel, FM Belfast, Midlake, Fanfarlo, Sexy Sushi, Fortune, dan le sac vs Scroobius Pip, DJ Kentaro
Sunday, July 18 : Jamiroquai, -M-, Alain Souchon, Julian Casablancas, Etienne de Crecy, Pony Pony Run Run, Toots & the Maytals, Gush, Raggasonic, Bost & Bim, Bitty Mclean, Soul Stereo, Lord Zeljko, Contreo & l'Orchestre de Bretagne

2009 

 "Les Vieilles Charrues remettent le son", on 13 and 14 March :
Friday : La Chanson du Dimanche, Zaza Fournier, Guillaume Cantillon
Saturday : Les Ramoneurs de Menhirs, Craftmen Club, Mister Alone
 In 2009, the summer festival hosted:
Thursday, July 16 : Bruce Springsteen "The Boss" and The E Street Band, The Killers, Fiction Plane, Priscilla Ahn
Friday, July 17 : Lenny Kravitz, Bénabar, Nneka, Birdy Nam Nam, TV on the Radio, Micronologie, Montgomery, The Jim Jones Revue, Alela Diane, Joseph Arthur, Alamo Race Track, Olle Nyman
Saturday, July 18 : Charlie Winston, Renan Luce, Les Tambours du Bronx, Ghinzu, La Rue Kétanou, Cocoon, Izia, Coming Soon, Nashville Pussy, Naïve New Beaters, The Driver (aka Manu le Malin), Surkin, Metronomy, Big Fest Noz, Championnat du monde d'Air Biniou
Sunday, July 19 : Moby, Francis Cabrel, 2 Many DJ's, Julien Doré, Coming Soon, Alborosie, The Ting Tings, Baba Salah, Les Tambours du Bronx, L'Angle Mort (Zone Libre VS Casey & Hamé), Serge Teyssot-Gay, Yo Majesty, Ministère des Affaires populaires

2008 

 Second edition of the spring festival "Les Vieilles Charrues Remettent le Son" :
Saturday, March 1: La Rumeur, L'Épopée
Friday, March 7 : La Grande Sophie, Maion & Wenn, Wine
Saturday, March 8 : Déportivo, Sna-Fu, Hifiklub
 For the 17th Festival (July 17–20) the program was :
Thursday, July 17 : Ben Harper & the Innocent Criminals, Motörhead, Babyshambles, BB Brunes
Friday, July 18 : ZZ Top, Christophe Maé, Yael Naïm, Gogol Bordello, AaRON, Calvin Harris, Ben's Brother, Patrick Watson, Senser, Constance Verluca, Sharko
Saturday, July 19 : Etienne Daho, The Gossip, Matmatah, Gad Elmaleh, Camille, Yelle, Duffy, Zebramix, The Go! Team, Dub Incorporation, Simian Mobile Disco, Brisa Roché, Crystal Castles, Does It Offend You, Yeah?, SebastiAn ...
Sunday, July 20 : Vanessa Paradis, The Hives, The Kooks, The Dø, Aṣa, Thomas Dutronc, The Wedding Present (replacing The Wombats), Psy 4 de la Rime, Wax Tailor, Foreign Beggars, Morcheeba

2007 

For the first time, a spring festival was held in March : Les Vieilles Charrues Remettent le Son.
Friday, March 9 : Miossec, Constance Verluca
Saturday, March 10 : Renan Luce, Brisa Roché, Babet, John Lord Fonda, Yelle, datA, Débruit.
Sunday, March 11 : Mayra Andrade, Ozan Trio
In 2007 the summer festival lasted 4 days. July 19–22
Thursday, July 19 : Charles Aznavour, Les Rita Mitsouko, Sanseverino, Philippe Katerine
Friday, July 20 : Peter Gabriel, Arcade Fire, Jacques Higelin, Kaolin, Ayọ, Fabulous Trobadors, LCD Soundsystem, Clap Your Hands Say Yeah, Donavon Frankenreiter, Art Brut, DJ Zebra, Stuck in the Sound, Nelson, Fancy, Lugo, Christel Vars, Les Vedettes
Saturday, July 21 : Bryan Ferry, Tryo, Salvatore Adamo, Kaiser Chiefs (canceled), Emilie Simon, JoeyStarr, Gentleman & The Far East band, Sean Lennon, Justice, Herman Düne, Para One, Goose, Galaxie, DJ Funk, Tékel, Dr Vince, Mr Maqs, Daniel Hélin, Thomas VDB
Sunday, July 22 : Yannick Noah, Scissor Sisters (canceled), Kasabian, Grand Corps Malade, Groundation, Rickie Lee Jones, Abd Al Malik, Raul Paz, Keny Arkana, Emily Loizeau, Oxmo Puccino & The Jazzbastards, Beat Assailant, Interzone, Thomas VDB

2006 
 Fifteenth year anniversary for the Festival, July 20–23:
 Thursday, July 20 : Johnny Hallyday, Mauss, Les Têtes Raides
 Friday, July 21 : Placebo, Raphael, Rhesus, !!!, Yann Tiersen, dEUS, FDB, Shout Out Louds, Diam's, 113, K'Naan, Soig Siberil, Abstrackt Keal Agram, Didier Super
 Saturday, July 22 : Madness, Cali, Jamel Debbouze, Babylon Circus, Les Cowboys Fringants, Editors, HushPuppies, Orange Blossom, Lords of Altamont, Besh o droM, DJ Champion, Karkwan Plaster, Ghislain Poirier, Fest-noz
 Sunday, July 23 : Pixies, Tracy Chapman, Julien Clerc, Dionysos, Da Silva, Bumcello, Rodolphe Burger, Meteor Show Extended VOL 2, Olivia Ruiz, Infadels, Winston McAnuff & the Bazbaz Orchestra, Soulwax Nite Version, Erol Alkan, 2 Many DJs, Digitalism

2005 
July 22,23 and 24
 Friday : Deep Purple, New Order, Buena Vista Social Club presents Ibrahim Ferrer, LCD Soundsystem, Ba Cissoko, Luke, Jane Birkin, Jeanne Cherhal, Sheer K, Ghinzu, An Pierlé, Hollywood Porn Stars, Dj Morpheus, Soldout
 Saturday : Iggy and The Stooges, Mickey 3D, Ridan, Amadou et Mariam, The Sunday Drivers, Louis Bertignac, Jamie Cullum, Devendra Banhart, The Kills, Laetitia Shériff, Vitalic, Swayzak, La Phaze, Nils Petter Molvaer, Missill
 Sunday : Franz Ferdinand, Bernard Lavilliers, Tiken Jah Fakoly, Laurent Garnier, Tinariwen, Blues Explosion, Michel Delpech, Rachid Taha, Nosfell, Florent Marchet, Kool Shen, TTC, Busdriver, Goldie Lookin' Chain, Psykick Lyrikah

2004 
July 23,24 and 25

 Friday : Rokia Traoré, The Coral, Texas, The Divine Comedy, Pleymo, Starsailor, Alain Bashung, Ralph Myerz, Little Axe, Junior Delgado, Adrian Sherwood, New Paulette Orchestra, Fabulous Trobadors, Iration Sleepers
 Saturday : Tété, Paul Personne, Patti Smith, -M-, The Streets, A.S. Dragon, Jim Murple Memorial, Cali, Girls in Hawaii, Blood & Burger, Erik Truffaz, Emilie Simon, Abstrackt Keal Agram, X-Makeena
 Sunday : Lhasa, Thomas Fersen, IAM, Muse, Freestylers, Sonic Machine, Hugues Aufray, Ilene Barnes, Kings of Leon, Horace Andy, Clotaire K, Svinkels, Buck 65, La Rumeur

2003 
July 14,18,19 and 20
 Friday : Salif Keïta, Pretenders, Renaud, Arno, Röyksopp, Hocus Pocus, Enrico Macias, Israel Vibration, Flogging Molly, High Tone, Interlope, Stupeflip, Monsieur Orange, EZ3kiel
 Saturday : Nada Surf, Carlos Núñez, Zazie, Tricky, Gotan Project, Arthur H, Massilia Sound System, Les Wampas, Mickey 3D, Le Peuple de l'Herbe, The Herbaliser, Hexstatic, Amon Tobin, DJ Vadim & Russian Percussions
 Sunday : 22 Pistepirkko, Laurent Voulzy, Bénabar, Supergrass, R.E.M., Ceux qui marchent debout, Karin Clercq, Bikini Machine, Rodolphe Burger, Calexico, Ganga, Tony Allen, DJ Maüs, Gnawa Njoum Experience

2002 
July 14,19,20 and 21
 Friday : Cheb Mami, Les Rita Mitsouko, Spook & the Guay, Joseph Arthur, Paris Combo, De la Soul, Patrice, Gonzales
 Saturday : Louis Chedid, Miossec, Asian Dub Foundation, The Cure, Les Caméléons, Dionysos, Tiken Jah Fakoly, Dominique A, Hawksley Workman, Llorca, The Youngsters, Aqua Bassino, Frédéric Galliano & The African Divas
 Sunday : Sanseverino, Yann Tiersen, Gérald De Palmas, Iggy Pop, Youssou N'Dour, Susheela Raman, Brigitte Fontaine, Sergent Garcia, Marianne Faithfull, US3, Dreadzone, Bauchklang, DJ Seb the Player, Greg Dread

2001 
July 14,20,21 and 22
 Friday : Black Uhuru feat Sly & Robbie, Henri Salvador, Ben Harper, Denez Prigent, Brooklyn Funk Essentials, Mickey 3D, Hooverphonic, Georges Moustaki, Arno, Le Peuple de l'Herbe
 Saturday : Java, Claude Nougaro, Têtes Raides, Noir Désir, Saint Germain, Gnawa Diffusion, K2R Riddim, Klaktonclown, Zenzile, Rubin Steiner
 Sunday : Kat Onoma, Matmatah, Placebo, Manu Chao, Gilles Servat, Occidentale de Fanfare, Maceo Parker, Ska-P, Vanessa Paradis, Dupain

2000 
July 14,21,22 and 23
 Friday : The Cranberries, William Sheller, Alan Stivell, La Ruda Salska, Saïan Supa Crew, Silmarils, Gomez, Emir Kusturica & The No Smoking Orchestra, Raspigaous, Hilight Tribe
 Saturday : Joe Cocker, Louise Attaque, -M-, 16 Horsepower, Mass Hysteria, Day One, Marcel et son Orchestre, Percubaba, Rinôçérôse, Siméon Lenoir
 Sunday : Beck, Eddy Mitchell, Joan Baez, Asian Dub Foundation, Muse, The Skatalites, Femi Kuti, U Roy, Sergent Garcia, Les Goristes

1999 
July 13–18

 Tuesday : Rasta Bigoud, Gilles Servat & Bagad Locoal Mendon, Hastan
 Wednesday : Armens, Orchestre national de Barbès
 Thursday : Faudel, Dolly, Cornu, Freedom For King Kong, Pat O'May, François Audrain, Karma, Menestra
 Friday : Massive Attack, Hubert-Félix Thiéfaine, Matmatah, Death in Vegas, Yann Tiersen, Mangu, Soïg Sibéril, Beth, Sloy, Pevar Den, Mister Gang
 Saturday : Stephan Eicher, Eagle Eye Cherry, Véronique Sanson, Tryo, Denez Prigent, Andre Williams & The Countdowns, Erik Marchand & Le Taraf de Caransebes, Arkan
 Sunday : Pierre Perret, Ben Harper & The Innocent Criminals, Jacques Higelin, Burning Spear, Sinsemilia, Cesária Évora, Ensemble Matheus, Rachid Taha, Annie Ebrel - Riccardo Del Fra, The Little Rabbits, Filaj

1998 
July 17,18 and 19

 Friday : MC Solaar, Jean-Louis Aubert, The Wailers, Natacha Atlas, Matmatah, Khamelean, Bambi Cruz.
 Saturday : Charles Trenet, Louise Attaque, Johnny Clegg & Bagad Kemper, The Gladiators, Zebda and Red Cardell.
 Sunday : Iggy Pop, Bernard Lavilliers, Shane MacGowan & The Popes, Yuri Buenaventura, Pigalle, Trio Roland Becker, FAB, Didier Squiban, Tyour Gnawa.

1997 
July 4,5,6
 Friday : Jane Birkin, Nada Surf, Miossec, Blankass, Kent.
 Saturday : Simple Minds, Linton Kwesi Johnson, Bagadou du Tonnerre, Marousse, Bates Motel.
 Sunday : James Brown, Claude Nougaro, Diaouled ar Menez, Doo the Doo, Spontus

1996 
July 5,6 and 7

Miossec, Bernard Lavilliers, Zebda, Les Innocents, Maxime Le Forestier, Frank Black, Ouf La Puce ..., Marcel et Son Orchestre, Red Cardell, Tayfa, Boulequies et Sonotones, Ar re Yaouank, Gwenc'hlan, Oxyde de Cuivre, The Guilt.

1995 
July 7–9, First Edition in Carhaix

Blues Brothers, The Silencers, Red Cardell, Ar Re Yaounak, Spook & the Guay, Soul Cactus, Taraf de Haïdouks Junior, Carré Manchot, A Bout de Souffle, Ongi Etorri, Mike Hutchison, Namas Pamos.

1994 
Held at Landeleau (July 5)

Les Satellites, Dolly, Oy Ventilo, Les Raouls j’te Pousse, Scotch Snap, La Folyre.

1993 
Landeleau (Saturday 10)

Les Pires, Oy Ventilo, La Folyre, Soft Touch Band, Students Brass Band and B12

1992 

Creation of fête des Vieilles Charrues as a small village event in Landeleau. No concert poster nor list available.

Stages of the festival

Glenmor 
Glenmor stage is the biggest stage of the festival. It is named after Emile Le Scanff, also known as Glenmor. With a total surface area of 1,000 m², Glenmor stage is one of the largest French stages.

As every other stage of the festival, Glenmor stage is set up before each occasion of the festival, and taken down after the end of the concerts.

Kerouac 
Kerouac stage is the second stage of the festival. It is named after Jack Kerouac, whose ancestors were from Brittany.

Grall 
Grall stage is the third stage of the festival and is named after Xavier Grall. Hip-hop and electronic music artists often play on this stage.

Gwernig 
The smallest stage of the festival, Gwernig, is located under a circus tent. It is named after the Breton-American poet Youenn Gwernig. Concerts on Gwernig stage are traditionally held by Breton music and world music bands.

References

External links

 NGO in Carhaix-Plouguer

Breton festivals
Rock festivals in France
Recurring events established in 1992
July events
Annual events in France
Tourist attractions in Brittany